Leung Tsz Chun (born 19 May 1985 in Hong Kong) is a former Hong Kong professional footballer. He played as a striker and as a right-winger.

Career statistics

International

Hong Kong
As of 18 August 2012

Hong Kong U-23
''As of 18 April 2007

Honours
 Eastern
 Hong Kong Senior Shield: 2007–08
 Hong Kong FA Cup: 2013–14

 Pegasus
 Hong Kong FA Cup: 2009–10

 Sun Hei
 Hong Kong Senior Shield: 2011–12

External links
 

1985 births
Living people
Hong Kong footballers
Association football midfielders
South China AA players
Hong Kong Rangers FC players
Southern District FC players
Dreams Sports Club players
Hong Kong First Division League players
Hong Kong Premier League players
Eastern Sports Club footballers
TSW Pegasus FC players
Tai Po FC players
Hong Kong international footballers